Bargad may refer to:

Places
 A village in the Republic of Chad

Other
 A name for the banyan tree in the Hindi language
 Luxottica's new brand of glasses